Alive and Ticking is a German comedy film directed by . It was released in 2011.

Plot
Eva is a 17-year-old girl with Tourette syndrome. Most of the time, she is happy, because her crazy, but loving family accepts her as she is. Eva tries everything to get her family out of a difficult financial situation, when she discovers that her father has obtained a new job and is moving the family to Berlin. But, her tics keep her from getting jobs. She learns through this situation to not let her tics control her life. Together with her dotty grandma and her crazy uncle, she tries to help securing the family's income.

Cast 
 Jasna Fritzi Bauer: Eva Strumpf
 Waldemar Kobus: Daddy Strumpf
 Victoria Trauttmansdorff: Mom Strumpf
 Stefan Kurt: Uncle Bernie
 Renate Delfs: Grandma Strumpf
 Traute Hoess: Psychologist
 Falk Rockstroh: Mister Kühne
 Stefan Lampadius: Mushroom picker
 Jürgen Rißmann: Johnny Blaubeermarmelade
 Nora Tschirner: Staff executive
 Katja Liebing: Bank assistant
 Das Bo: Juror
 Jannis Niewöhner: Young man in pet shop

Festivals 
The film participated at several German and international film festivals like 2011 Shanghai International Film Festival or 2011 International Filmfest Emden

Awards and nominations 
2011: Talented Young Actor Award for Jasna Fritzi Bauer at the German FilmArtFestival Mecklenburg-Pomerania.

External links

References

2011 films
2010s German-language films
2011 comedy films
German comedy films
Films about disability
Films about Tourette syndrome
Films set in Berlin
2010s German films